"Neutron Star Collision (Love Is Forever)" is a song by the English alternative rock band Muse, featured on the soundtrack to the 2010 film The Twilight Saga: Eclipse. Recorded by the band in 2010, the song was released as the lead single from the album on 17 May 2010.

The single became a top ten hit in Italy. It was also certified gold by Federation of the Italian Music Industry.

History
The song was first announced on Stephenie Meyer's official website. BBC Radio 1 aired the full song at 7.30pm on 17 May 2010, during Zane Lowe's show, accompanied by an interview with Matt Bellamy. Matt Bellamy explained that the song was written after he split with his longtime girlfriend at the end of 2009, and was based on his feelings at the beginning of their relationship. A 30-second preview of the music video is displayed on the official MTV website. While Muse featured on the Twilight and New Moon soundtracks previously (with "Supermassive Black Hole" and a special remix of  "I Belong to You" respectively), this marks the first time the band has produced the lead single for a movie.

Composition
The song is written in D-flat major, incorporating modal interchange in the chorus and outro.

Music video
The video first shows Matt Bellamy playing on his piano while red smoke rises from the background. When the first "love is forever" is uttered, the scene shifts to a scene from The Twilight Saga: Eclipse. The video continues to play clips from Eclipse until near the end of the song, where the piano scene is seen again.

Track listing

Reception
In a positive review, BBC Music described the song as Muse "turning their reality-altering Preposteriser Ray on their own back catalogue". Above and Beyond Magazine wrote: "Neutron Star Collision... reminds [me] of their previous work Origin of Symmetry, which is in my mind, the real and honest Muse."

Charts and certifications

Weekly charts

Year-end charts

Sales and certifications

References 

2010 singles
2010 songs
Muse (band) songs
Music videos directed by Anthony Mandler
Rock ballads
Songs from The Twilight Saga (film series)
Songs written by Matt Bellamy